Girls! Girls! Girls! is a 1962 American musical comedy film starring Elvis Presley as a penniless Hawaii-based fisherman who loves his life on the sea and dreams of owning his own boat. "Return to Sender", which reached No. 2 on the Billboard pop singles chart, is featured in the film. The film peaked at #6 on the Variety box office chart and finished the year at #19 on the year-end list of the top-grossing films of 1962, having earned $2.6 million at the box office. It was also nominated for the Golden Globe award for Best Motion Picture - Musical in 1963.

The film was the second of three films Presley shot on location in Hawaii.

Plot

Ross Carpenter is a Hawaii-based fishing guide and sailor who enjoys boating and sailing out on the sea. When he finds out his boss is retiring to Arizona, he seeks to find a way to buy the Westwind, a boat that he built with his father.

Ross is caught in a love triangle with two women: childish, insensitive club singer Robin, and sweet Laurel. When Wesley Johnson makes advances on Laurel, Ross punches him out. Wesley owns the boat, so Ross thereby loses it. Laurel, however, is not who she pretends to be. Ross has to choose between her and Robin.

Cast
 Elvis Presley as Ross Carpenter	
 Stella Stevens as Robin Gantner
 Laurel Goodwin as Laurel Dodge
 Jeremy Slate as Wesley Johnson
 Benson Fong as Kin Yung
 Beulah Quo as Madam Yung
 Guy Lee as Chen Yung
 Ginny Tiu as Mai Ling
 Elizabeth Tiu as Tai Ling
 Alexander Tiu as Mai and Tai Ling's Brother
 Robert Strauss as Sam Anderson
 Ann McCrea as Mrs. Arthur Morgan 
 Jack Nitzsche as Piano Player in Lounge Band 
 Hal Blaine as Drummer in Lounge Band 
 Nestor Paiva as Arthur Morgan 
 Linda Rand as Village Woman 
 Edward Sheehan as Ed-Man on Dock 
 Red West as Bongo-Playing Crewman on Tuna Boat

Soundtrack

Reception
A review in Variety wrote that the film put Presley "back into the non-dramatic, purely escapist light musical vein," adding, "Essentially, Presley plays himself in the breezy sea session. He handles the role capably, though one would hardly expect a hardened fisherman to be as soft, smooth and white as the one Presley depicts. The character has little depth, but he is pleasant." The Monthly Film Bulletin wrote that the songs were "strung very pleasantly on a story-line of disarming simplicity and bedded comfortably in a stretch of gently fizzing repartee." Margaret Harford of the Los Angeles Times called it "no better or worse than previous Elvis epics."

Awards and nominations
 Golden Globes: Nominated for Best Motion Picture - Musical at the 1963 ceremony. The winner that year was The Music Man. Elvis Presley received a 2nd place Laurel Award for the best male performance in a musical for his acting role in this movie.

Box office
Girls! Girls! Girls! earned $2,600,000 at the box office in the United States.

See also
 List of American films of 1962

References

External links
 Elvis in Hawaii fansite.

Movie reviews
Review by Jamie Gillies at Apollo Movie Guide

DVD reviews
Review of the movie collection "Lights! Camera! Elvis! Collection (King Creole, Blue Hawaii, G.I. Blues, Fun in Acapulco, Roustabout, Girls! Girls! Girls!, Paradise, Hawaiian Style, Easy Come, Easy Go) by Paul Mavis at DVD Talk, August 6, 2007.
Review by Jon Danziger at digitallyOBSESSED!, February 3, 2003.

1962 films
1962 musical comedy films
1962 romantic comedy films
American musical comedy films
American romantic comedy films
American romantic musical films
1960s English-language films
Films directed by Norman Taurog
Films set in Hawaii
Paramount Pictures films
Films shot in Hawaii
Films produced by Hal B. Wallis
Films with screenplays by Edward Anhalt
Sailing films
Films about fishing
Films about singers
1960s American films